Suriname toads are members of the frog genus Pipa, within the family Pipidae. They are native to northern South America and extreme southern Central America (Panama). Like other pipids, these frogs are almost exclusively aquatic.
8

Species
There are seven recognized species:
 Pipa arrabali Izecksohn, 1976 – Arrabal's Surinam toad
 Pipa aspera Müller, 1924 – Albina Surinam toad
 Pipa carvalhoi (Miranda-Ribeiro, 1937) – Carvalho's Surinam toad
 Pipa myersi Trueb, 1984 – Myers' Surinam toad
 Pipa parva Ruthven and Gaige, 1923 – Sabana Surinam toad
 Pipa pipa (Linnaeus, 1758) – Surinam toad
 Pipa snethlageae Müller, 1914 – Utinga Surinam toad
In addition, Pipa verrucosa Wiegmann, 1832 is included here incertae sedis.

Ecology and Behavior
Life Cycle

During reproduction the female Pipa frog will rise to the surface of the water with the male and after a series of movements the male fertilizes the eggs of the female. The male then places the eggs on the females back with its feet. The female Pipa frog will then incubate the eggs in the dorsal (its back). The tadpoles then develop in the dorsal of the female.

References

External links

YouTube footage of Surinam toads emerging

 
Pipidae
Amphibian genera
Amphibians of Central America
Amphibians of South America
Taxa named by Josephus Nicolaus Laurenti